The 2020 season was the Dallas Cowboys' 61st in the National Football League and their first under head coach Mike McCarthy. This was the first season since 2006 that Jason Garrett was not part of the coaching staff, as his contract expired on January 14, 2020. For the second time since 2002, tight end Jason Witten was not on the opening day roster, as he signed with the Las Vegas Raiders on March 17, 2020. For the first time since 2012, center Travis Frederick was not on the opening day roster, as he announced his retirement on March 23, 2020.

The Cowboys failed to improve upon their 8–8 season from the previous year after their Thanksgiving loss to the Washington Football Team. The next week, they were defeated by the Baltimore Ravens to suffer their first losing season since 2015. Factors in their struggles during the season included multiple key injuries, most notably starting quarterback Dak Prescott suffering a compound fracture and dislocation to his ankle during their Week 5 win against the New York Giants. Their defense surrendered a per-game average of 29.6 points over a total of 6,183 yards gained. The Cowboys were eliminated from playoff contention for the second consecutive year in Week 17 via their loss to the New York Giants.

Offseason

Signings

(*) - Released before start of season

(**) - Opted out of season due to COVID

(†) - Later released

(††) - Later traded

Re-signings

Departures

Draft

Notes
 The Cowboys traded their sixth-round selection to the Miami Dolphins in exchange for defensive end Robert Quinn.
 The Cowboys were awarded a fifth-round compensatory draft pick for the loss of Cole Beasley during the 2019 free agency period.

Staff

Rosters

Opening preseason roster

Week one roster

Final roster

Preseason
The Cowboys would have played the Pittsburgh Steelers in the Pro Football Hall of Fame Game on August 6, at Tom Benson Hall of Fame Stadium in Canton, Ohio, and the Cowboys were to be represented by head coach Jimmy Johnson and safety Cliff Harris. However, the game, the annual Hall of Fame enshrinement and the remainder of the preseason were later cancelled due to the COVID-19 pandemic, and the Hall of Fame game between the Cowboys and Steelers was rescheduled for 2021.

Regular season

Schedule
The Cowboys' 2020 schedule was announced on May 7.

Note: Intra-division opponents are in bold text.

Game summaries

Week 1: at Los Angeles Rams

Despite a fourth quarter comeback attempt, the Cowboys were unable to tie the game or take the lead after wide receiver Michael Gallup was controversially called for offensive pass interference, negating a 47-yard pass from quarterback Dak Prescott and leading to the Cowboys' final drive stalling. With the loss, Dallas started the season at 0–1.

Week 2: vs. Atlanta Falcons

The game began with the Cowboys falling behind 20–0 at the heaviest deficit. The Cowboys would start fighting back with Ezekiel Elliott's touchdown in the second quarter. The Falcons would re-boost their lead but failed the two-point conversion attempt. At halftime, the Cowboys would trail 29–10. Dak Prescott ran for two more touchdowns to cut the Falcons lead to 29–24. The Falcons added another ten points as the Cowboys trailed 39–24. Late in the fourth quarter, the Cowboys scored 16 unanswered points to prevent the Cowboys from starting 0–2, as well as sending the Falcons to their first 0–2 start since 2007. They finished the comeback after they successfully recovered a Greg Zuerlein onside kick with 1:49 left in the game and drove down to the 30 yard-line, where Zuerlein kicked a 46-yard field goal as time expired. This was the first time Dallas successfully kicked an onside kick since Week 17 of the 2014 season. With their first win, the Cowboys improved to 1–1 on the season. This win also makes the Cowboys the first team in NFL history to allow at least 39 points and win without defensive takeaways.

Week 3: at Seattle Seahawks

Despite initially battling back to take a 31–30 lead late in the 4th quarter, the defense allowed the Seattle offense to score a go-ahead touchdown with 1:47 left to play. The Cowboys would drive into Seattle territory, but the Seahawks would intercept Prescott in the end zone with just six seconds left. With this loss, the Cowboys dropped to 1–2 on the season.

Week 4: vs. Cleveland Browns

The Cowboys defense had no answers for the Browns' rushing attack. Despite initially leading 14–7, the Cowboys allowed 34 unanswered points by the end of the 3rd quarter. The Cowboys would cut the lead to 41-38 late in the 4th quarter, but the Browns proved they were too strong for the Cowboys as they ran away with the 49–38 win.

With this loss, the Cowboys dropped to 1–3 on the season. This was also the first time since 1994 that the Cowboys lost to the Browns.

Week 5: vs. New York Giants

Former head coach Jason Garrett, now offensive coordinator of the rival Giants, made his first return to Dallas since leaving the team following the previous season. The game turned into an offensive shootout, with the lead changing multiple times. The Cowboys claimed victory after scoring two consecutive field goals in the final minutes of the game, improving to 2–3 after beating the still-winless Giants. During a tackle made by Giants Logan Ryan in the third quarter with 6:46 remaining, Dak Prescott suffered compound fracture and dislocation injuries to his right ankle, ending his season. Former Cincinnati Bengals quarterback Andy Dalton finished the comeback for the Cowboys. This win was proven costly as the Cowboys would only win four more games in Prescott's absence.

Week 6: vs. Arizona Cardinals

Dallas concluded its three-game homestand on Monday Night Football against the Arizona Cardinals, with Andy Dalton making his first start in a Cowboys uniform in place of the injured Dak Prescott. However, Prescott's absence would quickly be felt as the Cowboys would struggle on both sides of the ball throughout the game. The Cardinals raced out to a 21–0 lead in the second quarter and never looked back, taking advantage of two fumbles by Ezekiel Elliott and adding an 80-yard touchdown reception by Christian Kirk. The Cowboys offense committed a season-high four turnovers, all of which led to Cardinals scoring drives. Moreover, Dalton struggled in his Cowboys debut, throwing two interceptions and finishing with a 65.8 passer rating. With the 38-10 blowout loss, Dallas dropped to 2-4 for the first time since the 2015 season. The 28-point loss marked their worst at home since losing 37–9 to the Philadelphia Eagles in Week 11 of the 2017 season, and tied that loss for their worst margin of defeat at AT&T Stadium.

Week 7: at Washington Football Team

The situation went from bad to worse for the Cowboys, who had no answers for Washington's defense. After a goal-line stand on Washington's opening drive, a strip sack by Landon Collins on Andy Dalton led to an early Washington safety. Washington then marched down the field, extending their lead to 9–0 on a 12-yard touchdown run by Antonio Gibson. The Cowboys responded with their only points of the afternoon on a Greg Zuerlein field goal. However, Washington would score two more touchdowns in the second quarter to put the game out of reach for Dallas. With this loss, Dallas dropped to 2–5 on the season, and 0–2 without Dak Prescott. Quarterback Andy Dalton would leave the game in the third quarter following a late hit by Washington linebacker Jon Bostic, who was subsequently ejected. Rookie quarterback Ben DiNucci would finish the game in place of Dalton, who was evaluated for a concussion.

Week 8: at Philadelphia Eagles

With Andy Dalton ruled out due to the concussion he suffered during the Week 7 loss to Washington, rookie quarterback Ben DiNucci made his first NFL start as the Cowboys visited the rival Philadelphia Eagles in a key NFC East showdown. The Cowboys' struggling defense stepped up against the sputtering Eagles offense, forcing a season-high four turnovers and holding Philadelphia to seven first half points. However, Dallas' offense had struggles of its own - DiNucci lost two fumbles, both of which led to Eagles touchdowns, including a controversial 53-yard return by Eagles safety Rodney McLeod. Further, the Cowboys were held without a touchdown for the second consecutive week, only being able to muster three Greg Zuerlein field goals. DiNucci finished with 180 yards passing and a rating of 64.6 in the 23–9 loss, and Dallas fell to 2–6 on the season and third place in the NFC East. This marked the first time that the Cowboys lost multiple division games in one season since the 2016 season, when all three of their regular season losses came within the division.

Week 9: vs. Pittsburgh Steelers

The Cowboys entered the game as 14-point underdogs. It would only be the second time in Cowboys history that they would be double digit underdogs at home. The Cowboys would lead at halftime, but the Steelers would pull away and win the game. The Cowboys dropped to 2–7, and suffered their first four-game losing streak since 2015, when the Cowboys had the same such start. This loss also ensures the Cowboys got pushed to the brink of a non-winning season for back-to-back years. This was the first time the Cowboys would do so since they did in 2010–2013.

Week 11: at Minnesota Vikings

The Cowboys were 7-point underdogs entering the game. Despite this, the Cowboys snapped their 4-game losing streak and improved to 1-4 without Dak Prescott. The game would be sealed after forcing a turnover on downs and then running out the game clock. The game's biggest highlight was a CeeDee Lamb catch for a touchdown. This win improved the Cowboys to 3–7 on the season.

Week 12: vs. Washington Football Team
Thanksgiving Day games

The Cowboys returned home hoping to avoid being swept by the Washington Football Team. A controversial fake punt attempt caused the Cowboys, who were already trailing, to trail further. The Cowboys would never score again, as the Cowboys dropped to 3–8 and were swept by Washington for the first time since 2012. This loss also ensures the Cowboys could no longer improve on their 8–8 season from the previous season.

Week 13: at Baltimore Ravens

The depleted Cowboys traveled to Baltimore to take on the Ravens, in search of the franchise's first win there. The game was originally scheduled to be played on December 3, 2020. Due to a COVID-19 outbreak among the Ravens organization, the game was moved to December 8. The Cowboys continued to struggle, and dropped to 3–9 and were guaranteed their first losing season since 2015. The Cowboys lost 6 of the last 7 games without Dak Prescott.

Week 14: at Cincinnati Bengals

Andy Dalton made his first return to Cincinnati since getting released by the Bengals during the 2020 offseason. The Cowboys improved to 4–9 with the blowout win. This win keeps the Cowboys in the race for an NFC East title, aided by the fact that all NFC East teams had losing records.

Week 15: vs. San Francisco 49ers

The Cowboys returned home without injured Ezekiel Elliott, to play against the 49ers, another team dealing with injury issues throughout the season. The Cowboys jumped out to a 14–0 lead early, by touchdown plays by Tony Pollard and wide receiver Michael Gallup. Like it has been all season long, the Cowboys defense struggled all game long. Despite the weak defensive performance, the Cowboys defense took the ball away four times, tied the most takeaways by the Cowboys in the 2020 season. CeeDee Lamb returned a kickoff for a 47-yard touchdown, making the score 41–27. With the game already won, the Cowboys gave a last hurrah to the 49ers, ending the game with the final score of 41–33. The win, with assistance from a loss by the Washington Football Team improved the Cowboys to 5–9 and kept the Cowboys' season alive, as well as eliminating San Francisco from playoff contention.

Week 16: vs. Philadelphia Eagles

After falling behind 14-3 after one quarter, the Cowboys outscored the visiting Eagles 34–3 over the final three quarters. The 37–17 win improved Dallas to 6–9 on the season and eliminated Philadelphia from playoff contention. The Cowboys' own playoff hopes were also kept alive thanks to the Washington Football Team's 20–13 loss to the Carolina Panthers. This win was Dallas' 40th home win and 70th overall win against Philadelphia in their rivalry.

Week 17: at New York Giants

Despite a second-half comeback, a decision to not attempt a two-point conversion on their third quarter touchdown came back to haunt them, since, trailing by 4 points instead  of 3 within 10 yards of the end zone and having to get a touchdown rather than a field goal, their touchdown pass was intercepted and the Cowboys lost to the Giants for the first time since 2016, ending a seven-game winning streak against them. With the loss (though even if Dallas had won, the Washington win hours later would have still eliminated them), Dallas finished 6–10 and missed the playoffs in back-to-back seasons for the first time since the 2010–13 seasons. This was also the first time since 2015 that the Cowboys lost 10 or more games in a season. With this loss, the Cowboys went 4-7 without Dak Prescott.

Standings

Division

Conference

Notes

References

External links
 
 

Dallas
Dallas Cowboys seasons
Dallas Cowboys
2020 in Texas
2020s in Dallas